Alternative or alternate may refer to:

Arts, entertainment and media
 Alternative (Kamen Rider), a character in the Japanese TV series Kamen Rider Ryuki
 AlterNative, academic journal
 The Alternative (film), a 1978 Australian television film
 The Alternative, a radio show hosted by Tony Evans
 120 Minutes (2004 TV program), an alternative rock music video program formerly known as The Alternative
The American Spectator, an American magazine formerly known as The Alternative: An American Spectator
 Alternative comedy, a range of styles used by comedians and writers in the 1980s
 Alternative comics, a genre of comic strips and books
 Alternate ending, ending of a story that is discarded in favor of another resolution
 Alternative media, media practices falling outside the mainstreams of corporate communication
 Alternative title, the use of a secondary title for a work when it is distributed or sold in other countries

Music
 Alternative (album), a B-sides album by Pet Shop Boys
 The Alternative (album), an album by IAMX
 "Randy Scouse Git" (released as "Alternate Title" in the UK), by the Monkees, 1967
 "Altern-ate", a song by H-el-ical//, 2020

Genres
 Alternative country
 Alternative dance
 Alternative hip hop
 Alternative metal
 Alternative R&B
 Alternative reggaeton
 Alternative rock, also known as "alternative music" or simply "alternative"
 Indie pop, sometimes known as "alternative pop"
 Indie folk, sometimes known as "alternative folk"

Culture and society
 Alternate (sports), a replacement or backup for a regular or starting team player
 Alternative break, trip where a group of college students engage in volunteer service
 Alternative culture, a variety of subcultures existing along the fringes of mainstream culture
 Alternative dispute resolution, processes and techniques outside the traditional mainstream of jurisprudence
 Alternative fashion, fashion that does not conform to mainstream styles
 Alternative giving, form of gift giving
 Alternative housing, domicile structures that are built or designed outside of the mainstream norm
 Alternative idol, term used by overseas J-pop fans
 Alternative lifestyle, a lifestyle that is not within the cultural norm
 Alternative medicine, healing practice that does not fall within the realm of conventional medicine
 Alternative dentistry
Alternative model, models who do not conform to mainstream ideals of beauty
Alternative movement
Alternative tourism

Education
 Alternative education, non-traditional education
 Alternative school, a school geared towards students whose needs cannot be met in a traditional school

Mathematics and science
 Alternative algebra, an abstract algebra with alternative multiplication
 Alternative computing, computing by a wide range of new or unusual methods
 Alternative formats
 Alternative logics, formal systems that differ in a significant way from standard logical systems
 Alternativity, a weaker property than associativity
 Alternate leaves, a classification in botanical phyllotaxis

Politics
 Alternative facts, expression associated with political misinformation established in 2017
 Alternative (Mauritania), political party
 The Alternative (Denmark), a green political party in Denmark
 The Alternative (France), electoral coalition
 The Alternative (Palestine), a former electoral alliance of several socialist Palestinian groups
 Alternativa (Kosovo political party), a liberal political party in Kosovo
 Alternativa (Italian political party), a populist political party in Italy
 Alternativa (North Macedonian political party), an Albanian political party in North Macedonia

Other uses
 Alternative beta, concept of managing volatile alternative investments
 Alternative data, inclusion of non-financial payment reporting data in credit files
 Alternative data (finance), data used to obtain insight into the investment process
 Alternative finance, financial channels, processes, and instruments that have emerged outside of the traditional finance system
 Alternative investment, investment other than stocks, bond (finance), money funds, and cash
 Alternative liability, legal doctrine
 Alternative pleading, legal term in the law of the United States

See also
 Alternate (theatre)
 Alternate reality (disambiguation)
 Alternatives, a Canadian non-governmental organization
 Alternating (disambiguation)
 Alternative press (disambiguation)
 The Alternate (disambiguation)
 Alternative science (disambiguation)